Mark Applegarth (born 10 December 1984), also known by the nickname of "Mash", is an English former professional rugby league footballer who played in the 2000s and 2010s.
He was appointed as head-coach of Wakefield Trinity, following Willie Poching's departure, in September 2022.

Background
Applegarth was born in Newton Hill, Wakefield, West Yorkshire, England. As of 2020, he lives in the Wakefield area with his wife Jessica, they were married at Sandburn Hall, Flaxton, York during 2018.

Playing career
He represented the Great Britain/Great British Schoolboys against the Australian Schoolboys during 2002. Applegarth came through the ranks at the Wakefield Trinity Wildcats and made his début as an 18-year-old. Upon leaving the Wakefield Trinity Wildcats due to injuries he joined the York City Knights. He was released from his contract with the York City Knights during June 2010 to pursue a career in Australia. After a brief stint with the Temora Dragons in New South Wales, Applegarth played for the Central Queensland Comets based in Rockhampton in the Queensland Cup competition. During 2012 Applegarth signed for the  Batley Bulldogs under his former Wakefield Trinity Wildcats coach John Kear. During 2014 after another serious knee-injury, Applegarth re-signed for the York City Knights to become their player/assistant coach. He retired from playing during 2016 and as of 2019, he is the Head of Youth at Wakefield Trinity.

References

External links
 (archived by web.archive.org) Statistics at rleague.com

1984 births
Living people
Batley Bulldogs players
Central Queensland Capras players
English rugby league players
Rugby league players from Wakefield
Rugby league locks
Rugby league props
Rugby league second-rows
Wakefield Trinity coaches
Wakefield Trinity players
York City Knights players